Manolis Roussakis (born 15 February 1996) is a Greek professional footballer who plays as a centre-back.

References

External links
 

1996 births
Living people
Super League Greece 2 players
Football League (Greece) players
Gamma Ethniki players
First Professional Football League (Bulgaria) players
Panthrakikos F.C. players
Anagennisi Karditsa F.C. players
Platanias F.C. players
Xanthi F.C. players
FC Arda Kardzhali players
Irodotos FC players
Almopos Aridea F.C. players
Association football defenders
Footballers from Heraklion
Greek footballers
Greek expatriate footballers
Greek expatriate sportspeople in Bulgaria
Expatriate footballers in Bulgaria